BPR may refer to:

BPR (Quebec firm), a Canadian engineering firm
BPR Global GT Series, a 1994–1996 international sports car racing series
Berkeley Political Review, a nonpartisan political magazine. 
Banque Populaire du Rwanda
Belarusian People's Republic
Blue Ridge Public Radio
Business process re-engineering
Bypass ratio of a turbofan engine
Bulgarian People's Republic Former Socialist country and Europe and a member of the Warsaw Pact